The 2015–16 Armenian First League season began on 3 August 2015 and finished on 27 May 2016.

League table

See also
 2015–16 Armenian Premier League
 2015–16 Armenian Cup

References

Armenian First League seasons
2015–16 in Armenian football
Armenia